Rebecca Gomperts (born 1966) is a Dutch physician and activist for women's rights, in particular abortion rights. She is the founder of Women on Waves and Women on Web, which provide reproductive health services for women in countries where these are not provided. In 2013 and 2014, she was included in the BBC's 100 Women. In 2018, she founded Aid Access, which operates in the United States. A trained abortion specialist and activist, she is generally considered the first abortion rights activist to cross international borders.

Gomperts was included in Times 100 Most Influential People in 2020.

Early life 
Rebecca Gomperts was born in 1966 in Paramaribo in Suriname. Her family moved to the Netherlands when she was three years old and she grew up in the harbor town of Vlissingen. Despite growing up in a small town, an international consciousness was instilled in her that would drive her future career.

Gomperts moved to Amsterdam in the mid-1980s after high school. Having an interest for both the arts and sciences, she studied visual arts and medicine. She studied conceptual art and completed a four-year art degree at Amsterdam's Rietveld Academy, while at the same time attending medical school. As she found that art was not the path she wanted to follow, she dived into the world of medicine; Gomperts did not find her calling in the field of reproductive medicine until later on in her medical career.

Career

Early career 
After graduation from medical school, Gompert worked in a small hospital in Guiana as a trainee doctor. This is where, at the age of 25, she witnessed the realities of illegal abortions for the first time. As of 1997, she was a 31-year old doctor based in Amsterdam who performed legal abortions.

Between 1997-1998, Gomperts sailed with a Greenpeace ship called the Rainbow Warrior II as a resident physician and environmental activist. She sailed through Latin America, visiting Romania and Guinea.

Idea for change 
After her travels with Greenpeace, Gomperts's interest in reproductive health increased. Gomperts wanted the health damages and death rates from botched at-home abortions to decline, so she designed a program founded upon the radical idea that women can do safe abortions and get medical abortions performed where abortion clinics are highly restricted or don't exist at all.

Gomperts used contacts she had made during art school to help her design and fund a mobile clinic. A close friend of hers, Joep van Lieshout, agreed to help design the clinic. The collaborative idea was for the clinic to be a functional work of art  and a mobile clinic aboard a ship so that it could legally pass through international borders without the medical equipment being seized. Gomperts applied for funds from the Dutch  to finance $500,000 necessary for medical equipment and $190,000 of seed capital. The grant for the mobile clinic came from the Mondriaan Foundation. Gomperts's background in art helped her to put her dream into action, and her mobile clinic became "a space for fusion of work that is symbolic with work that is social."

Women on Waves, 1999 

Gompets formed her organization Women on Waves in 1999, after she got back from her voyage on the Rainbow Warrior II. Women on Waves was bringing non-surgical abortion services and education to countries all around the world that didn't have them. The Women on Waves mission transcends the boundaries between law, medicine, seafaring, and art.

Using the grant from the Mondriaan Foundation, Women on Waves would rent a boat on which the mobile clinic would be held. Many media outlets were shocked that Gomperts was not at all concerned with her ship being detained, impounded, or sunk when entering a nations' waters.

Women on Waves made many voyages. News spread quickly that she was trying to reach countries where abortion was illegal through their waters and many of these countries put up incredible measures to stop her. The first voyage was to Ireland, then following was Poland, Portugal, Spain, Morocco, and Guatemala. Although her first eleven-day trip to Dublin was deemed unsuccessful by the media, Women On Waves had received more than 200 abortion requests from women ashore who needed their help, which was more attention than Gomperts had ever imagined. Women on Waves was never intended on solving the problem of unsafe abortions, but to help create legal precedent in the grey areas of the abortion laws of countries, to reach all those women who had been refused help by their own physicians, and to prevent the dangers of unsafe abortion procedures.

Women on Web, 2005 
Women on Waves faced many challenges during the voyages. On one of her trips to Portugal, her mobile clinic was not allowed to dock. Gomperts appeared on a Portuguese talk show instead. She talked about how woman could perform a safe abortion by themselves at home, how to get and take the pills, and all other medical advice she could say on air. This is when Gomperts realized that she could reach more people through the internet than in a boat. "In the end our ship will never be a structural solution for the enormous number of women who need abortions", said Gomperts.

This is when in 2005, Gomperts' second organization, Women on Web, was founded. In 2016 Women on Web was receiving more than 10,000 emails a month from more than 123 countries across the world. Women could ask questions that ranged from how to administer abortion pills, to advice on contraceptives, to even relationship consulting. Instead of delivering abortion pills from the sea, Women on Web uses packages and drones to send pills and instructions for safe, at-home abortions.

Aid to Access, 2018 
In 2018, she founded Aid Access, which operates in the United States. Aid Access has shipped mifepristone and misoprostol from a pharmacy in India to "tens of thousands of people in the USA, regardless of their address" after they fill out an online form, exclude contraindications, and report a gestation of 10 weeks or less.

Personal life 
As of 2007 Gompert had two children and lived in Amsterdam.

Popular culture 
Vessel, a documentary about Gomperts' mission of Women on Waves premiered in 2014 at the Southwest Film Festival and continued to be available . This documentary witnesses the creation of a network of reproductive health activists lead by Gomperts. It shows their work on global reproductive rights, and the conceptual idea of trusting women to handle their own abortions. The story of transforming a widely improbable idea into a global movement is a moving picture that captured Gomperts' legacy entirely.

Women on Web also had an ad campaign advertising their services through Diesel, one of the most famous saying "Say Goodbye to Coat Hangers", a common tool used for at-home unsafe abortions. These ads had a very important secret component of a barcode hidden in plain site of the photography. If scanned, the barcodes on the T-shirts of the models give information on the abortion pill right to the viewers cellphone. This was an innovative way to advertise such an important message without stirring the pot of what is appropriate in public media.

Feminist art activism 
Gomperts is now arguably the abortion right movements first extremist. Although Gomperts moved away from art, her legacy lives in feminist art activism. Art is configured as a space apart from all else, that provides activism in a safe space. Gomperts WoW projects don't combine art and activism so much as they intentionally play on their vague separation.

A-Portable 
The mobile clinic that Joep van Lieshout (founder of Atelier van Lieshout) designed was called the A-Portable. This functional and comforting space was a collaborative effort between Gomperts and Van Lieshout. They put a feminist spin on Gomperts' original inspiration of the activism on the Rainbow Warrior II. Designed by an artist and funded by an artistic foundation, the A-Portable was labelled a functional work of art. This meant that whenever a transport ministry tried to confiscate the container on national waters, the certification of the A-Portable being a sculpture, made its border crossing legal.

Art exhibitions 
After Women on Waves gained some international recognition, they began to participate in art exhibitions around the world. Art shows were just another campaign to create public awareness in different forms.

The A-Portable was exhibited in the 49th Venice Biennale in 2001. Being a key work in the exhibition, it was presented on a raft, floating just out in the waters at the Arsenale.

There were four other exhibitions in 2001 where Gomperts collaborated with Willem Velthoven. These four installations, Portrait Collector, Sea, I Had An Abortion and Every 6 Minutes were presented in the Mediamatic Women on Waves show.

Portrait Collector was a collection of internet kiosks where viewers who had had abortions could photograph themselves and become part of the exhibition. Gomperts was trying to exhibit how often abortions occur, and how they can be performed on almost anyone.

Sea was also an interactive narrative composed of shots of the sea taken on Women on Waves' first exhibition to Ireland. Its audio component was a poetic work of voices of women asking Women on Waves for help.

I Had An Abortion was hanging wire coat hangers with vests hung on them, each vest had "I Had An Abortion" written on it in all European languages.

The final installation, Every 6 Minutes, had a very simple message. Every six minutes a red lamp flashes, symbolizing the statistic that every six minutes a woman dies from an unsafe abortion.

On July 12, 2003, the Mediamatic Supermarkt entrance was blocked with the A-Portable. This interactive exhibition presented by Mediamatic was the final installation of their Women On Waves exhibition. It allowed viewers to walk into the portable container that was transformed into an abortion clinic and sailed across international waters.

References 

1966 births
Living people
Dutch women physicians
Reproductive rights activists
BBC 100 Women